Vincenzo Coppo (born March 29, 1905 in Mirabello Monferrato) was an Italian professional football player.

Honours
 Serie A champion: 1929/30.

1905 births
Year of death missing
Italian footballers
Serie A players
ACF Fiorentina players
Atalanta B.C. players
Inter Milan players
A.C. Prato players
Reggina 1914 players
Association football defenders
Acqui U.S. 1911 players
Vigevano Calcio players